André Salmon (4 October 1881, Paris – 12 March 1969, Sanary-sur-Mer) was a French poet, art critic and writer. He was one of the early defenders of Cubism, with Guillaume Apollinaire and Maurice Raynal.

Biography 
André Salmon was born in Paris, in the XI arrondissement, the fourth child of Émile-Frédéric Salmon, a sculptor and etcher, and Sophie-Julie Cattiaux, daughter of a founder of the Radical Socialist Party. Often assumed to come from a Jewish family, they were in fact secular Republicans, frequently in financial difficulty, and moved several times. André Salmon claimed in a letter to the editor of Le Crapouillot, now in a private collection, that his family descended from the Renaissance poet Jean Salmon Macrin, whose position in the court of Francis I may have indicated that his forebears were not Jewish. However, there were Jews in France at this time. 

Salmon's education was neglected, although he received some tuition from the Parnassian poet Gaston de Raisme, a friend of François Coppée. 
From 1897 to 1902 he stayed in St-Petersburg, first with his parents and then as an assistant in the chancellery of the French consulate. 

In 1902 Salmon returned to France for military service but was dismissed after a few months due to his weak physical condition. In the first decade of the 20th century, he mixed with literary circles of Paris' Latin Quarter. Then he met a young, then unknown poet Guillaume Apollinaire, and with a group of young artists, they formed an artistic group. 
In 1904 he moved into the Bateau-Lavoir and lived there with Picasso, Max Jacob, and Apollinaire.
He lived a Bohemian life for several years until he fell in love with Jeanne Blazy-Escarpette.
He found work as a journalist with L'Intransigeant and also contributed to Le Soleil.
He married Jeanne on 13 July 1909 and settled with her on rue Rousselet in the 7th arrondissement of Paris.

During World War I (1914–18) Salmon enlisted in the army as a volunteer and served in the trenches.
He was invalided in 1916 and returned to Paris where he became a factotum on the journal L'Éveil of Jacques Dhur.
Salmon organized the exhibition L'Art Moderne en France from 16–31 July 1916 for the wealthy fashion designer Paul Poiret.
Salmon gave "26 Avenue d'Antin" as the address and called the exhibition the "Salon d'Antin".
Artists included Pablo Picasso, who showed Les Demoiselles d'Avignon for the first time, Amedeo Modigliani, Moïse Kisling, Manuel Ortiz de Zárate and Marie Vassilieff.
Another of Poiret's exhibitions, also organized by Salmon, was La Collection particulière de M. Paul Poiret, from 26 April to 12 May 1923.

In the following years, Salmon continued to work as a journalist for works such as L'Europe nouvelle and La Paix sociale, while publishing poems, short stories, critiques, and essays.
From 1928 Salmon worked for Le Petit Parisien as a court reporter.
In the 1930s he ran into financial difficulties, while his wife became increasingly dependent on opium.
Salmon was sent to Spain by the Petit Parisien to report on the Spanish Civil War (1936–39) from the Francoist side.
His reports, deeply critical of the Fascists, were censored by the paper.

During World War II (1939–45) he was sent to Beirut as a war correspondent. After the fall of France, he made his way back via Marseille to Paris, where he found his wife struggling to survive. He rejoined Le Petit Parisien, but avoided any controversial subjects, and was forced to defend himself against attacks from the far-Right who accused him of being a Jew and a supporter of "degenerate art".

After the Liberation of France Salmon was sentenced to five years of "national indignity" for his work as a journalist in occupied France and had to publish under a pseudonym.

His wife died on 1 January 1949. On 29 October 1953, he remarried. In November 1961 he moved from Paris to Sanary, where he had built a small house in 1937. In 1964 Salmon was awarded the Grand Prix for poetry by the French Academy.

He died on 12 March 1969 at his home in Provence.

Works

Poetry 
 Poèmes, Vers et prose, 1905
 Féeries, Vers et prose, 1907
 Le Calumet, Falque, 1910
 Prikaz, Paris, Éditions de La Sirène, 1919
 C'est une belle fille! Chronique du vingtième siècle, Albin Michel, 1920
 Le Livre et la Bouteille, Camille Bloch éditeur, 1920
 L'Âge de l'Humanité, Paris, Gallimard, 1921
 Ventes d'Amour, Paris, À la Belle Édition, chez François Bernouard, 1922
 Peindre, Paris, Éditions de la Sirène, 1921
 Créances 1905–1910 (Les Clés ardentes. Féeries. Le Calumet). Paris, Gallimard, 1926
 Métamorphoses de la harpe et de la harpiste, Éditions des Cahiers Libres, 1926
 Vénus dans la balance, Éditions des Quatre Chemins, 1926
 Tout l'or du monde, Paris, Aux éditions du Sagittaire, chez Simon Kra, coll. Les Cahiers nouveaux, n. 36, 1927
 Carreaux 1918–1921 (Prikaz. Peindre. L'Âge de l'Humanité. Le Livre et la Bouteille), Paris, Gallimard, 1928
 Saints de glace, Paris, Gallimard, 1930
 Troubles en Chine, René Debresse éditeur, 1935
 Saint André, Paris, Gallimard, 1936
 Odeur de poésie, Marseille, Robert Laffont, 1944
 Les Étoiles dans l'encrier, Paris, Gallimard, 1952
 Vocalises, Paris, Pierre Seghers, 1957
 Créances, 1905–1910, followed by Carreaux 1918–1921, Paris, Gallimard, 1968
 Carreaux et autres poèmes, preface by Serge Fauchereau, Paris, Poésie/Gallimard, 1986

Books and short stories 
 Tendres canailles, Paris, Librairie Ollendorff, 1913, and Paris, Gallimard, 1921
 Monstres choisis, Paris, Gallimard, 1918
 Mœurs de la Famille Poivre, Geneva, Éditions Kundig, 1919
 Le Manuscrit trouvé dans un chapeau, Société littéraire de France, 1919, and Paris, Stock, 1924
 La Négresse du Sacré-Cœur, Paris, Gallimard, 1920, 2009
 Bob et Bobette en ménage, Paris, Albin Michel, 1920
 C'est une belle fille, Paris, Albin Michel, 1920
 L'Entrepreneur d'illuminations, Paris, Gallimard, 1921
 L'Amant des Amazones, Éditions de la Banderole, 1921
 Archives du Club des Onze, Nouvelle Revue Critique, 1924
 Une orgie à Saint-Pétersbourg, Paris, Aux éditions du Sagittaire, chez Simon Kra, La Revue européenne, n. 13, 1925
 Comme un homme, Eugène Figuière Éditeurs
 Noces exemplaires de Mie Saucée, Henri Paul Jonquières
 Le Monocle à deux coups, Paris, Jean-Jacques Pauvert, 1968

Critiques, essays, memoirs 
 La Jeune Peinture française (including Histoire anecdotique du cubisme), Paris, Albert Messein, 1912, Collection des Trente
 Histoires de Boches, with drawings by Guy Dollian. Paris, Société littéraire de France, 1917
 La Jeune Sculpture française, Paris, Albert Messein, 1919, Collection des Trente
 L'Art vivant, Paris, Georges Crès, 1920
 Propos d'atelier, Paris, Georges Crès, 1922
 La Révélation de Georges Seurat, Brussels, Éditions Sélection, 1921
 Cézanne, Paris, Stock, 1923
 André Derain, Paris, Gallimard, 1924
 Modigliani, Les Quatre chemins, 1926
 Kisling, Éditions des Chroniques du Jour, 1927
 Henri Rousseau, dit le Douanier, Paris, Georges Crès, 1927
 Émile Othon Friesz, Éditions des Chroniques du Jour, 1927
 Chagall, Éditions des Chroniques du Jour, 1928
 L'Art russe moderne, Éditions Laville, 1928
 Léopold-Lévy, Éditions du Triangle
 Ortiz de Zarate, Éditions du Triangle
 Picasso, Éditions du Triangle
 L'érotisme dans l'art contemporain, Éditions Calavas, 1931
 Le Drapeau noir, 1927
 Léopold Gottlieb, 1927
 Voyages au pays des voyantes, Paris, Éditions des Portiques
 Le Vagabond de Montparnasse: vie et mort du peintre A. Modigliani, 1939
 L'Air de la Butte. Souvenirs sans fin, Paris, Les Éditions de la Nouvelle France, 1945
 Paris tel qu'on l'aime, préface de Jean Cocteau, collectif, 1949
 Souvenirs sans fin, 3 volumes:
 Première époque (1903–1908), Paris, Gallimard, 1955
 Deuxième époque (1908–1920), Paris, Gallimard, 1956
 Troisième époque (1920–1940), Paris, Gallimard, 1961
 Le Fauvisme, Paris, Éditions Aimery Somogy-Gründ, 1956
 La Vie passionnée de Modigliani, 1957
 La Terreur noire, Paris, Jean-Jacques Pauvert, 1959. L'Échappée, 2008
 Claude Venard, 1962
 Henri Rousseau, 1962
 Baboulène, 1964
 Modigliani le roman de Montparnasse, 1968 
 À propos de Marc Chagall, 2003

Theatre 
 Natchalo (with René Saunier), mise en scène Henri Burguet, 7 April 1922, Théâtre des Arts
 Deux hommes, une femme (with  R. Saunier)
 Sang d'Espagne (with R. Saunier)

References

Sources

External links

 

French art critics
1881 births
1969 deaths
Artists from Paris
20th-century French poets
People of Montmartre